Flitto (Hangul: 플리토) is a global crowdsourcing translation platform (iOS, Android, web), where you can request translations as you need or become a translator if you can speak more than one language. You can read various content, such as celebrity's social media, Contents, e-commerce deals, and more, all in your native language.

Flitto provides human-powered translations. Machine translation has its limits as it cannot reflect cultural backgrounds or other specific situation in a given context. Flitto, on the other hand, offers a full human-powered translation service which overcomes these issues. Flitto's goal is to break down all the language barriers.

The service supports text, image, and voice translations, and 1:1 translation in 25 different languages (Arabic, Chinese (simplified), Chinese (traditional), Czech, Dutch, English, French, German, Indonesian, Italian, Hindi, Japanese, Korean, Malay, Polish, Portuguese, Russian, Spanish, Swahili, Swedish, Tagalog, Thai, Turkish, Vietnamese) and the most recently added one is Finnish.

Flitto's current user estimate is 5+ million and is being used in 170 countries, with about 300K translations submitted daily.

History 
Flitto was incorporated on September 1, 2012, by founder Simon Lee along with co-founders Dan Kang and Jin Kim. The company was selected as the first Asian company to join SpringBoard incubation program in London (now Techstars London) the same year. Flitto's first official office was located at MARU180, a start-up center, located in Yeoksam-dong, Seoul. Its current office is located in Samseong-dong, Seoul. Since its inception, Flitto has been working with other global companies such as Microsoft, JYP, Google, and Naver.

Crowdsourcing translation

Point 
Points are required to request crowdsourcing translation. Points can either be purchased through credit card or by mobile phone (Korea only), PayPal, AliPay, or earned by submitting translations and having them selected.

Text 
Users can request texts in 25 different languages (Arabic, Chinese (simplified), Chinese (traditional), Czech, Dutch, English, Finnish, French, German, Indonesian, Italian, Hindi, Japanese, Korean, Malay, Polish, Portuguese, Russian, Spanish, Swahili, Swedish, Tagalog, Thai, Turkish, Vietnamese) by using points. Although Flitto shows the recommended points for each request, the user can manually change it. The requests will be pushed to different users who are capable of translating in the requested language, allowing them to translate for points.

Depending on the length of the text, the user can manually divide the text into short sections so that the request can be sent to different translator-users; which can shorten the lead time since sections can be translated at the same time by different translators. In order to keep consistency for translated text, requestors can leave a memo for the translators. The translators are able to read the full text, as well as translations other users have made on other parts of the text.

Image/GPS 
In situations where users feel difficult to cumbersome to make requests in form of text, they always have the option to make translation requests by simply taking a picture of the subject and posting it on Flitto. Also, using the GPS function, users can see image translations that have been done previously by other users within nearby area upon requesting image translations.

Voice 
Users can also record voices/sounds and make translation requests on Flitto when they are not able to understand that particular language.

1:1 Translation 
Flitto links experienced translators from various fields such as literature, science and tech with people/companies seeking high-quality translation through 1:1 translation service. 1:1 translation service allows users to directly select and make requests to translators that match his/her conditions (price, specialty, deadline). This service aims for those who have confidential business issues or need professional translations. Both requestors and translators can use 1:1 translation service on the Flitto website. The benefits as a requestor would be getting more accurate, fast and low-cost translations from professional translators; wide pool of translators to select from (over 1,000 translators); requestor can directly communicate with the translator who is on the task through the 1:1 Message service. The benefits as a translator would be the lowest commission/brokerage fees in the market and that the translator has more freedom to choose which translation projects to take on.

Other services

Discovery (SNS/Contents) 
Popular SNS accounts ranging from celebrities to media groups are translated into different languages. Currently supported SNS platforms are Twitter, Instagram, and Weibo. Celebrities, such as K-pop star PSY and Brazilian author Paulo Coelho, have publicly endorsed the service.

Twitter-certified celebrities can also log into Flitto through their Twitter accounts and leave a voice message that will be translated into 25 different languages. Celebrities use Flitto to communicate with their fans, and users can share their favorite celebrities's voice messages to their other social media accounts. Various K-pop stars such as members of Super Junior including Henry and Siwon, Teen Top, Block B, G.NA, etc. use Flitto as a platform to leave messages for global fans.

Flitto's 'Content' section is updated daily with interesting articles, news, and information from across the globe. The contents range vastly from humor to interesting facts, and are user-translated.

Store 
Users can spend the points they earned on Flitto's Store to purchase items, donate, or cash-out. Items consists of Flitto Hoody, Mobile e-coupon, Amazon gift cards and more. Donations can be made through the current open projects. Open projects differ every year and is done through Plan. Luxury items such as Apple iPhone, laptop and more are often featured as products during event periods as well.

QR code 
Users can scan the QR codes from Flitto's App and get the translation. Scanning the QR code will reveal the request and translation without having to log in. The QR codes are widely implemented by store owners and restaurant owners in major metropolitan areas of Seoul, including Myeongdong, Hongdae, and Insadong.

Achievements 
2012.09 - Received $800,000 seed investment from DSC Investment
2012.09 - Selected to participate in TechStars London incubation program (First Asian company to be part of the TechStars network)
2012.10 - 1st place at Innovative Tech Startup, organized by Morrison & Foerster (London)
2012.12 - 1st Asian company selected as Silicon Valley IR Company
2012.12 - Selected as one of the 5 picks from the 2012 Springboard Demo Day in Silicon Valley
2012.12 - 1st Asian company to make IR presentation at Facebook HQ
2013.03 - Selected to be part of the Korean Pavilion at SXSW 2013
2013.05 - Selected as a company to represent the creative economy by the Ministry of Science, ICT and Future Planning
2013.05 - 1st place at Mobile Start-up Korea Superstar, organized by MK News
2013.07 - Set an office in Silicon Valley
2013.08 - Selected to represent Seoul at the Seedstars World Competition (Switzerland)
2013.09 - Selected to be part of the Korean Pavilion at TechCrunch SF 2013
2013.09 - Made official launch for Flitto at TechCrunch Disrupt
2013.10 - Selected by the Israeli government to represent Korea for Start Tel Aviv (Championship)
2013.12 - Selected as the "Best Startup" at the Global K-Startup Program organized by the Korea Internet Security Agency and Plug and Play
2013.12 - Won the final round at Golden Pentagon (KBS)
2014.02 - Won 1st place at Seedstars World Competition (Switzerland)
2014.07 - Won grand prize at IDEAS Show Start-up Battle (Taiwan)
2015.03 - Opened a branch office in Beijing, China
2015.10 - Won the DemoTheWorld and Acquired ICP License (China)

Press attention 
2013.03 - Selected as one of "The Top 7 Things You Missed at SXSW" - Kansas City Business Journal
2014.09 - Covered by CNN International in the article, 'Korean Tech Giants'
2015.01 - Covered by Tech In Asia in the article, 'Korean entrepreneur went from translating K-Pop tweets to selling language data to web giants'
2015.04 - Featured on BBC as the first of episode of the series, 'The Making of Me', along with an article, 'From homework to a global business'
2016.01 - Featured on KBS1 New Year Special "Youth, South Korea"

See also 

 Babelnet
 vidby

References 

Crowdsourcing
Translation websites
South Korean companies established in 2012
Companies based in Seoul